Siegfried & Roy: The Magic Box is a 1999 American biographical film about magicians Siegfried & Roy directed by Brett Leonard and starring Siegfried & Roy as themselves with narration by Anthony Hopkins.

Plot
The film tells the life story of Siegfried and Roy. Siegfried discovers a magic book in a merchant's window and desires it as a means to solve his problems with his father at home. He takes a cruise ship bound for New York where he meets Siegfried, the resident magician, and joins his act.

Cast
Anthony Hopkins - narrator
Siegfried Fischbacher as himself
Roy Horn as himself
John Summers as Teen Siegfried
Dillon McEwin as Young Siegfried
Cameron Alexander as himself
Richie Solomon as himself
Steve Tom as Mr. Nagle
Kelly Van Halen as Mrs. Nagle
Chris Velvin as Dancer/Assistant

Production
Filming took place in Las Vegas, Nevada.

Release
The film was presented at IMAX locations and also had a limited release in educational locations such as the California Science Center as well in commercial locations such as Edwards cinemas starting October 1, 1999. It was later presented at the San Francisco International Lesbian and Gay Film Festival on June 22, 2000.

Reception
Lawrence Van Gelder of The New York Times wrote that the film "must be classified a disappointment" and was unimpressed with the 3D IMAX presentation, noting that "little seems wondrous" about the film.

References

External links
 

1990s biographical films
1999 films
American biographical films
1990s English-language films
Films directed by Brett Leonard
Films about magic and magicians
Films set in West Germany
Films set in the Las Vegas Valley
Films shot in the Las Vegas Valley
IMAX films
Films scored by Alan Silvestri
1990s American films